Lough Marrave is a small freshwater lake in county Leitrim in the northwest of Ireland.

Etymology
() translates to "". It is plausible Lough Marrave served a pagan sacrificial purpose, and the Keshcarrigan Bowl was deposited there as  a ritual offering. There is a reference in the "" to an unidentified and "" on the "road to Fenagh", with a marginal note attributed to Tadgh O'Roddy ( 1700) adding: "". Nevertheless, the origin of the "Dead lake" etymology remains speculative and unknown.

Geography
Lough Marrave is connected to St. John's Lough and Lough Scur by the Shannon–Erne Waterway.

Ecology
The presence, and type, of fish found in Lough Marrave is not recorded. The ecology of Leitrim waterways, such as Lough Marrave, is threatened by zebra mussel and other invasive species.

Human settlement
The primary human settlements at Lough Marrave are Keshcarrigan and Fenagh villages. Lough Marrave is bounded by the townlands of Gubroe to the south and east, Killmacsherwell to the north, and Rossy to the west.

Heritage
The Keshcarrigan Bowl was discovered in the canal between Lough Scur and Lough Marrave in the 19th century, and is today preserved at the National Museum of Ireland.

See also
 List of loughs in Ireland
 Keshcarrigan
 Castlefore Lough
 Keshcarrigan Lough

References and notes

Notes

Citations

Primary references

Secondary references

External links 

Castlefore